The 1973 Tampa Spartans football team represented the University of Tampa in the 1973 NCAA Division I football season. It was the Spartans' 37th season and they competed as an NCAA Division I independent. The team was led by head coach Dennis Fryzel, in his first year, and played their home games at Tampa Stadium in Tampa, Florida. They finished with a record of eight wins and three losses (8–3). Fryzel was hired on January 3, 1973, to serve as the replacement for Earle Bruce who resigned to become the head coach at Iowa State.

Schedule

References

Tampa
Tampa Spartans football seasons
Tampa Spartans football